Aleuritic acid, or α-aleuritic acid, is a major ingredient in shellac, constituting about 35% of it. It is used as a starting material in the perfume industry for the preparation of musk aroma.

References
 

Fatty acids